White Nights is a 1992 Russian film directed by Leonid Kvinikhidze based on the novel of the same name by Fyodor Dostoyevsky. The events of the picture are moved to the present day, the 1990s.

Cast
Vadim Lyubshin as Mitya
Anna Matyukhina as Nastya
Nikolai Yeremenko Jr. as tenant
Galina Polskikh as Nastya's aunt
 Vitaly Usanov as Redhead
 Igor Nadzhiev as singer
 Pavel Kornakov as episode

Critical response
Leonid Kvinikhidze's film is one of the best roles of Galina Polskikh according to Film.ru.

According to Russian film critic Mikhail Trofimenkov, this film adaptation was unsuccessful.

 Alexander Fedorov: Screening the story of Fyodor Dostoevsky White Nights, Leonid Kvinikhidze transferred its action to St. Petersburg in the early 90s of the twentieth century. In theory, additional meanings, unexpected parallels should have arisen, the original author's vision of the material should have appeared. In my opinion, this did not happen. Acting does not go beyond the scope of an ordinary melodrama, and the philosophy of the great Russian classic has dissolved in a banal and instructive modernized plot.

References

Literature

External links 
 
1992 films
1990s Russian-language films
Russian drama films
1992 drama films
Films based on White Nights
Films scored by Maksim Dunayevsky
Films based on short fiction

Films set in Saint Petersburg
Lenfilm films
Russian romantic drama films